Mosele is a surname. Notable people with the surname include:

Alexios Mosele (disambiguation), multiple people
Banjo Mosele (born 1960), Botswana guitarist, singer and composer 
Giacomo Mosele (born 1925), Italian cross-country skier
Victor Mosele, 20th century American Roman Catholic priest